Events from the year 1639 in Spain.

Incumbents
Monarch: Philip IV

Events

Births
February 12 - Juan García de Salazar, composer (d. 1710)

Deaths

 
Years of the 17th century in Spain